Darkest Hour is a 2017 war drama film directed by Joe Wright and written by Anthony McCarten. The film is an account of Winston Churchill's early days as Prime Minister of the United Kingdom during the Second World War and the May 1940 war cabinet crisis, depicting his refusal to seek a peace treaty with Nazi Germany amid their advance into Western Europe. It stars Gary Oldman as Churchill, alongside Kristin Scott Thomas as Clementine Churchill, Lily James as Elizabeth Layton, Stephen Dillane as Viscount Halifax, Ronald Pickup as Neville Chamberlain, and Ben Mendelsohn as King George VI. The title of the film refers to a phrase describing the early days of the war, which has been widely attributed to Churchill.

The film had its world premiere at the 44th Telluride Film Festival on 1 September 2017, and it was also screened at the Toronto International Film Festival. It began a limited release in the United States on 22 November 2017, followed by general release on 22 December, and was released on 12 January 2018 in the United Kingdom. The film grossed $150 million worldwide and received positive reviews from critics, who particularly lauded Oldman's performance and deemed it one of the best of his career.

Darkest Hour received several accolades, including Best Actor for Oldman at the Academy Awards. Oldman also won the BAFTA Award for Best Actor in a Leading Role, the Golden Globe Award for Best Actor – Motion Picture Drama, and the Screen Actors Guild Award for Outstanding Performance by a Male Actor in a Leading Role.

Plot

In May 1940, the opposition Labour Party in Parliament demands the resignation of British Prime Minister Neville Chamberlain for being too weak in the face of the Nazi onslaught. Chamberlain tells Conservative Party colleagues he wants Lord Halifax as his successor, but Halifax does not feel he is right at that time. Chamberlain decides to choose the only man whom the opposition parties will accept as the leader of a national government: Winston Churchill, the First Lord of the Admiralty, who correctly predicted the danger from Adolf Hitler before the war.

The next morning, Germany invades the Low Countries. Churchill is brusque with his new secretary Elizabeth Layton for mishearing him, which earns him a rebuke from his wife Clementine. King George VI, who strongly distrusts Churchill due to his support for his brother Edward VIII during the abdication crisis, reluctantly invites him to form a government. Churchill includes Chamberlain (as Lord President of the Council) and Halifax (as Secretary of State for Foreign Affairs). Churchill has a poor reputation in Parliament because of his record in the Admiralty, his role in the disastrous Gallipoli campaign in the First World War, his views on India, the Russian civil war and his past defection from the Liberal Party.

Parliament reacts coolly to Churchill's first speech promising "Blood, toil, tears, and sweat". Chamberlain and Halifax are appalled by Churchill's refusal to negotiate for peace and plan to resign from the government to force a vote of no confidence, creating a situation in which Halifax would be likely to become the Prime Minister.

Churchill visits French Prime Minister Paul Reynaud, who thinks Churchill delusional for not admitting that the Allies are losing the Battle of France, while Churchill becomes furious that the French do not have a plan to counterattack. Although US President Franklin Roosevelt is sympathetic to Churchill's plight, his actions are limited by an isolationist Congress and the Neutrality Acts. Churchill draws ire from his cabinet and advisers for delivering a radio address in which he falsely implies the Allies to be advancing in France, earning him a rebuke from the King. Halifax and Chamberlain continue to push to use Italian Ambassador Giuseppe Bastianini as an intermediary with Germany.

The British Expeditionary Force is trapped at Dunkirk and Calais, and Britain begins preparing for a German invasion. Against the advice of the War Cabinet Churchill orders Brigadier Nicholson in Calais to lead the 30th Infantry Brigade to distract the enemy and buy time for the evacuation of soldiers from Dunkirk. Layton tells Churchill that her brother was killed during the retreat.

The debacle in France causes the War Cabinet to support negotiating with Germany. Under heavy pressure, Churchill agrees to consider a negotiated peace, but chokes on the words as he tries to dictate a letter requesting talks. George VI unexpectedly visits Churchill; the King explains that he has come to support Churchill to continue the war. Churchill's idea of a "small boats" evacuation of troops from Dunkirk, Operation Dynamo, is initiated. Still uncertain, Churchill impulsively rides the London Underground (for the first time in his life) and asks startled passengers their opinions; the civilians all want to continue to fight Hitler. Churchill addresses the Outer Cabinet and other Members of Parliament and finds they too have little or no desire to surrender either.

As Churchill prepares to address Parliament, Halifax asks Chamberlain to continue with their plan to resign, but Chamberlain decides first to listen to the address. Towards the end of his speech, Churchill proclaims that "we shall fight on the beaches" should the Germans invade, to resounding support from the Opposition, while the Tory MPs behind him sit silently, until Chamberlain mops his brow with his handkerchief, a prearranged signal that they should support the PM. Churchill exits the chamber to cheers and enthusiastic waving of order papers.

Cast

 Gary Oldman as Winston Churchill
 Kristin Scott Thomas as Clementine Churchill
 Ben Mendelsohn as King George VI
 Lily James as Elizabeth Layton
 Ronald Pickup as Neville Chamberlain
 Stephen Dillane as Viscount Halifax
 Nicholas Jones as Sir John Simon
 Samuel West as Anthony Eden
 David Schofield as Clement Attlee
 Richard Lumsden as General Ismay
 Malcolm Storry as General Ironside
 Hilton McRae as Arthur Greenwood
 Benjamin Whitrow as Sir Samuel Hoare
 Joe Armstrong as John Evans
 Adrian Rawlins as Air Chief Marshal Dowding
 David Bamber as Admiral Ramsay
 Paul Leonard as Admiral Dudley Pound
 Demetri Goritsas as Cabinet Secretary Bridges
 Olivier Broche as Paul Reynaud
 Brian Pettifer as Kingsley Wood

David Strathairn provides the voice of President Roosevelt, heard on a phone call with Churchill. 

This was the final film role for Whitrow, who died a few weeks after the September premiere of the film.

Production

On 5 February 2015, it was announced that Working Title Films had acquired Darkest Hour, a speculative screenplay by The Theory of Everything screenwriter Anthony McCarten, about Winston Churchill in the early days of the Second World War.

On 29 March 2016, it was reported that Joe Wright was in talks to direct the film. In April 2016, Gary Oldman was reported to be in talks to play Churchill. On 6 September 2016, it was announced that Focus Features would release the film in the United States on 24 November 2017, while Ben Mendelsohn was set to play King George VI and Kristin Scott Thomas was cast as Clementine Churchill. On 8 November 2016, Stephen Dillane joined the cast. John Hurt was initially cast as Prime Minister Neville Chamberlain, but had to drop the role in pre-production because he was undergoing treatment for pancreatic cancer. Ronald Pickup assumed the role of Chamberlain instead. Hurt died from cancer in January 2017.

By November 2016, Darkest Hour had begun principal photography, and it was reported that Dario Marianelli would score the film. For his role as Churchill, Oldman spent over 200 hours having make-up applied, and smoked over 400 cigars (worth about $20,000) during filming. Filming took place in Manchester, England at both the Town Hall and John Rylands Library, both doubling for the Houses of Parliament and featuring heavily in the film.

For locations, the exterior of Chartwell House near Westerham, Kent, (Churchill's actual country home) was used for the telegram sequence that sees Churchill's secretary Elizabeth Layton receive a telegram from Buckingham Palace. Fort Amherst in Kent featured as the location for both General Ramsay's Operations HQ and the Calais Garrison. For the interior of Buckingham Palace, Wentworth Woodhouse in Wentworth, South Yorkshire, was used.

Reception

Box office
Darkest Hour grossed $56.5 million in the United States and Canada, and $93.8 million in other countries (including $33.4 million in the UK), for a worldwide total of $150.2 million.

The film opened in its theatrical weekend alongside Coco and Call Me By Your Name in United States theatrical release to be Cinemascore did wisely ordinary grades.

In the United States and Canada, the film began a limited release on 22 November 2017. In its first five days, it grossed $246,761 from four theatres (an average of $61,690), finishing 21st at the box office over the weekend. The film had its wide release on 22 December 2017, alongside the openings of Downsizing, Pitch Perfect 3 and Father Figures, and the wide release of The Shape of Water, and grossed $3.9 million from 804 theatres over that weekend, and $5.5 million over the four-day Christmas frame. 85% of its audience was over the age of 25, with 30% being 50 or older. The following weekend the film made $5.5 million, and a total of $7 million over the four-day New Years frame. The weekend of 27 January 2018, following the announcement of the film's six Oscar nominations, it made $2.1 million.

Critical response

On review aggregator website Rotten Tomatoes, the film holds an approval rating of 84% based on 316 reviews, with an average rating of 7.3/10. The website's critical consensus reads, "Darkest Hour is held together by Gary Oldman's electrifying performance, which brings Winston Churchill to life even when the movie's narrative falters." On Metacritic, which assigns a weighted average rating to reviews, the film has a normalised score of 75 out of 100, based on 50 critics, indicating "generally favorable reviews". PostTrak reported that over 90% of audience members gave the film a rating of either "excellent" or "very good".

Oldman was praised for his performance, with numerous critics labelling him a frontrunner to win the Academy Award for Best Actor, which he went on to win. Peter Travers of Rolling Stone wrote: "Get busy engraving Oldman's name on an Oscar... those fearing that Darkest Hour is nothing but a dull tableau of blowhard stuffed shirts will be relieved to know that they're in for a lively, provocative historical drama that runs on its own nonstop creative fire". David Ehrlich of IndieWire praised Wright's direction and the musical score, writing: "Unfolding with the clockwork precision of a Broadway play... it's a deliciously unsubtle testament to the power of words and their infinite capacity to inspire". Damon Wise of the Radio Times described the film as a "near-perfect companion piece" to Dunkirk, concluding, "Wright's forceful direction depicts not so much a hero as a principled man snatching victory from the jaws of defeat. Certain engineered Hollywood moments dilute the overall impact, including a twee meet and greet on a Tube train, but Oldman is never less than sensational."

Conversely, Brian Tallerico of RogerEbert.com called the film "an acting exercise weighed down by costumes, make-up, and over-lighting", adding that "there's nothing new to the approach. It feels often like an obligationa story that someone felt should be told again and a way to get a great actor his Oscar". Writing for GQ, Stuart McGurk described it as "a bad film. It's not terrible, it's just, well, not good. It's the kind of film you'd watch on Netflix if it was raining, or on an iPad if it was the only film on the iPad, or on TV if you'd lost the remote. There are many reasons for this, but the main one is director Joe Wright, who never met a script he didn't dumb-down." However, he also praised Oldman, saying, "despite all this, Gary Oldman winning for Best Actor is well deserved [...] genuinely unrecognizable, his Churchill somehow both less growly but more grave. In short, he plays the character not the caricature."

Home media 
Darkest Hour was released on digital streaming platforms on 6 February 2018 and on Blu-ray, DVD and 4K UHD Blu-ray on 12 June 2018.

Historical accuracy
Writing in Slate, historian and academic John Broich called Darkest Hour "a piece of historical fiction that undertakes a serious historical task", presenting the British decision to fight Hitler as a choice rather than an inevitability. The situation in 1940 was as dire as depicted, but liberties were taken with the facts.  The shouting matches over possible peace negotiations were fictional. The journey on the London Underground was also fictional, and there is evidence that many British people were not immediately inspired by Churchill's speeches.

There is no conclusive evidence that Chamberlain and Viscount Halifax were planning an imminent vote of no confidence, though that threat existed until the mid-war victories in North Africa.  It is a fact that Churchill was an object of suspicion for his fellow Tories. The Labour Party confirmed that they would serve in a national government under a leader other than Chamberlain, but did not name Churchill.

In The New Yorker, Adam Gopnik wrote: "... in late May of 1940, when the Conservative grandee Lord Halifax challenged Churchill, insisting that it was still possible to negotiate a deal with Hitler, through the good offices of Mussolini, it was the steadfast anti-Nazism of Attlee and his Labour colleagues that saved the day – a vital truth badly underdramatized in the current Churchill-centric film, Darkest Hour". This criticism was echoed by Adrian Smith, emeritus professor of modern history at the University of Southampton, who wrote in the New Statesman that the film was "yet again overlooking Labour's key role at the most dangerous moment in this country's history ... in May 1940 its leaders gave Churchill the unequivocal support he needed when refusing to surrender. Ignoring Attlee's vital role is just one more failing in a deeply flawed film".

Referring to Charles Moore's comment that the film was "superb Brexit propaganda", Afua Hirsch wrote in The Guardian: "I would call the film propaganda, more generally – and a great example of the kind of myth we like to promote in modern Britain. Churchill has been re-branded as a tube-travelling, minority-adoring genius, in line with a general understanding of him as 'the greatest Briton of all time'." Hirsch also criticised the film for "perpetuating the idea that Winston Churchill stood alone at the Darkest Hour, as Nazi fascism encroached, with Britain a small and vulnerable nation isolated in the north Atlantic. In reality, the United Kingdom was at that moment an imperial power with the collective might of Indian, African, Canadian and Australian manpower, resources and wealth at its disposal."

The film gives the impression that both Clementine Churchill and the King were able to listen to the 'beaches' speech live from Parliament. This was impossible because radio broadcasts from Parliament did not start until the 1970s. Churchill did record the speech for posterity, but he did not make the recording until 1949. Nor did he, unlike some other speeches, repeat that speech on the radio shortly after giving it in Parliament. The 'beaches' speech was first delivered on 4 June 1940 – after the Dunkirk evacuations, not on 28 May 1940 as suggested by the film.

Elizabeth Layton did not start working as Churchill's private secretary until May 1941, a year after the events depicted in the film. Similarly, the death of her brother during the retreat to Dunkirk, as alluded to in the film, is entirely fictional.

Chamberlain is referred to as 'Chairman' of the Conservative Party, but even after leaving Number 10 and becoming Lord President of the council, he retained the more important post of Leader of the Conservative Party.

Churchill refers to Halifax as "the fourth son of an earl" and says that "fourth sons turn nothing down". In reality, Halifax was the third son of Charles Lindley Wood, 2nd Viscount Halifax, and both of his elder brothers died while he was still a child, so he spent most of his youth and young adulthood as heir to his father's viscountcy (which he had already inherited by the time of the events depicted in the film).

Awards and honours

Sequel
Gary Oldman stated, in February 2018, that there was talk of a sequel to Darkest Hour that could also include Roosevelt (who had been voiced by David Strathairn in Darkest Hour) and take place during the Yalta Conference in 1945.

See also
 Churchill – Also released in 2017, starring Brian Cox as Churchill
 Dunkirk – Released in 2017, focusing on Operation Dynamo
 The Gathering Storm – 1974 similar film starring Richard Burton
 The Gathering Storm - 2002 film starring Albert Finney
 Into the Storm – 2009 film starring Brendan Gleeson

Notes

References

External links
 
 
 
 Darkest Hour at History vs. Hollywood

2017 films
2017 biographical drama films
2017 drama films
2017 war drama films
American biographical drama films
BAFTA winners (films)
British biographical drama films
Cultural depictions of Franklin D. Roosevelt
Cultural depictions of George VI
Cultural depictions of Neville Chamberlain
Cultural depictions of Winston Churchill
Films about Winston Churchill
Films directed by Joe Wright
Films featuring a Best Actor Academy Award-winning performance
Films featuring a Best Drama Actor Golden Globe winning performance
Films produced by Eric Fellner
Films produced by Tim Bevan
Films scored by Dario Marianelli
Films set in 1940
Films set in the 1940s
Films set in London
Films shot in Kent
Films shot in Greater Manchester
Films shot in South Yorkshire
Films that won the Academy Award for Best Makeup
Films with screenplays by Anthony McCarten
Focus Features films
Perfect World Pictures films
Universal Pictures films
Working Title Films films
World War II films based on actual events
2010s English-language films
2010s American films
2010s British films